Daphnella floridula is a species of sea snail, a marine gastropod mollusc in the family Raphitomidae.

Description
The length of the shell varies between 5.5 mm and 9.5 mm.

Distribution
This marine species was found off Mactan Island, Cebu, Philippines.

References

 Stahlschmidt P., Poppe G.T. & Chino M. (2014) Description of seven new Daphnella species from the Philippines (Gastropoda: Raphitomidae). Visaya 4(2): 29-38. page(s): 31.

External links
 Gastropods.com: Daphnella floridula

floridula
Gastropods described in 2014